Sam & Me is a 1991 Canadian drama film directed by Indo-Canadian filmmaker Deepa Mehta (in her directorial debut) and written by Ranjit Chowdhry, who also stars in the film with Peter Boretski and Om Puri. The film went on to win an honourable mention at the Cannes Film Festival.

Plot
23-year-old Nikhil, an Indian immigrant, is convinced by his uncle to work as a companion and care-giver to Sam, an elderly Jewish man, fed up with his life. As an unlikely friendship ensues, both men get new insight into life.

Cast
Ranjit Chowdhry as Nikhil "Shwartza" Parikh
Peter Boretski as Sam "Zayda" Cohen
Om Puri as Chetan Parikh
Heath Lamberts as Morris Cohen
Kulbhushan Kharbanda as Baldev
Javed Jaffrey as Xavier

Reception
"In her feature debut, director Deepa Mehta has made one of those fascinating, frustrating films where the sub-plot outshines the plot, where everything on the periphery of the frame is infinitely better than the nominal focal point. Because there, at the edges, we're treated to ethnic humour worthy of the label -- well-observed moments that explode some stereotypes and confirm others, moments that are wry and sharp and poignant." - Rick Groen in his review in Globe and Mail, September 20, 1991.

"Signifying the promise and the perils of cross-cultural dialogue, Sam and Me both validates and negates the multiculturalist utopian myth of interethnic cooperation." - Kass Banning "Playing in the Light: Canadianizing Race and Nation." In Gendering the Nation: Canadian Women's Cinema, edited by Kay Armatage, Kass Banning, Brenda Longfellow, and Janine Marchessault. Toronto: University of Toronto Press, 1999. (p. 293)

Streaming
As of 2018 the film was released online for free on Canada Media Fund's Encore+ YouTube channel.

References

External links
 

1991 films
1991 directorial debut films
1991 drama films
1990s Canadian films
1990s English-language films
Canadian drama films
English-language Canadian films
Films directed by Deepa Mehta
Films scored by Mark Korven
ITC Entertainment films